Raúl Rey (born 4 September 1936) is a Spanish former racing cyclist. He rode in the 1963 Tour de France.

References

External links
 

1936 births
Living people
Spanish male cyclists
Place of birth missing (living people)
Sportspeople from Ourense
Cyclists from Galicia (Spain)